LazyTown is an Icelandic children's television series created by aerobics champion Magnús Scheving. The show was designed to encourage healthy lifestyles. The series was based on Scheving's stage plays Áfram Latibær! (itself adapted from a book that Scheving wrote in 1991) and Glanni Glæpur í Latabæ. Every episode was filmed in Garðabær.

The series was commissioned by Nickelodeon in 2003, following the production of two stage plays and a test pilot. Originally performed in English, the show has been dubbed into more than thirty languages (including Icelandic) and aired in over 180 countries. The show combines live action, puppetry and computer-generated imagery, making it one of the most expensive children's shows ever made.

The first two seasons (fifty-two episodes) were produced from 2004 to 2007. LazyTown originally aired on Nickelodeon's Nick Jr. block in the United States, CBeebies and Nick Jr. in the United Kingdom and RÚV in Iceland. Turner Broadcasting System Europe acquired LazyTown Entertainment in 2011 and commissioned the third and fourth seasons. for a total of 26 new episodes, which premiered in 2013 on Turner's Cartoonito and later on Viacom's Channel 5.

Multiple spin-offs were created, including stage productions and a short-format television program for younger children titled LazyTown Extra.

Plot
The series follows an 8-year-old pink-haired girl named Stephanie, the newest resident of the LazyTown community. She has moved to LazyTown to live with her uncle, Mayor Milford Meanswell, and is surprised to learn that all of her neighbors lead inactive lifestyles. With the help of an above-average hero named Sportacus, she helps teach the other residents how to partake in more athletic pastimes. Her attempts are often nearly thwarted by Robbie Rotten, who prefers to lead a sluggish life and is agitated by the sudden boom of physical activity. On a regular basis, Robbie devises ill-judged schemes to make LazyTown lazy once again. However, his plans are never foolproof and always end with him losing.

Each of the children that Stephanie befriends embodies negative characteristics. Ziggy, who is kind-hearted and wants to be a superhero when he grows up, has an unbalanced diet devoid of fruits and vegetables. Pixel is a reclusive inventor who spends too much time on his computer. Stingy has a self-centered attitude and is possessive of nearly everything in town. Trixie is a troublemaker with little respect for rules and other people. As the series progresses, the characters become less lazy in favor of a healthier way of living which promotes such lifestyle to the audience watching to help with childhood obesity.

The program features a predominantly Eurodance soundtrack. Each episode features at least one original song and concludes with a different performance of "Bing Bang (Time to Dance)", which is sung by Stephanie. Many tracks are reworked versions of songs from the basis for Icelandic plays.

Characters

Main
 Sportacus 10 (portrayed by Magnús Scheving) is LazyTown's own "slightly above average hero" and the male main protagonist. He lives in a futuristic blue airship above LazyTown (renamed the "Sports Ship" in Series 4) and is alerted to people who need help by a beeping crystal that glows on the chest of his costume. Understanding, humble, courageous and helpful, he is devoted to exercise and has a rivalry with Robbie Rotten (though he always helps Robbie when the latter gets into trouble). Sportacus lives on a diet of fruit and vegetables, which he refers to as "sports candy". Consuming junk food makes him immediately lose all his strength and abilities, which can only be restored by eating healthier options. In Series 3, he gains some new gear, including a backpack which is integrated into his outfit. The backpack contains sports candy and various sports equipment, and his crystal now flashes red when his energy is low.
 Stephanie (portrayed by Julianna Rose Mauriello in Seasons 1–2 and by Chloe Lang in Seasons 3–4) is a happy-go-lucky, sweet-natured 8-year-old newcomer to LazyTown and the female main protagonist of the show. She lives in a yellow house with Mayor Meanswell, her uncle. Recognizable by her all-pink outfit, Stephanie is initially disappointed by Ziggy, Pixel, Stingy and Trixie's laziness, and tries to convince them to try healthier activities. Her attempts are often nearly thwarted by Robbie Rotten, but Stephanie is eternally optimistic and always manages to triumph over any challenges in the end. Stephanie is also an aspiring cheerleader and dancer, so she appreciates the fantastic moves that Sportacus performs.
 Robbie Rotten (portrayed by Stefán Karl Stefánsson) is the main antagonist who is always coming up with feckless schemes to make sure the other citizens stay lazy. He often disguises himself to trick the kids, or creates inventions to ruin their fun and discourage their newly-active lifestyles. He passionately abhors the influence of Stephanie and Sportacus on the townspeople and a number of his plans involve attempting to do away with them.
 Ziggy (puppeteered and voiced by Guðmundur Þór Kárason in the US and Lorraine Parsloe in the UK) usually wears a superhero suit with a cape. He loves to eat candy and sweets—particularly lollipops and taffy. After Stephanie arrived, he discovered that there is more to childhood than sugary foods. He is now active and participates in any sport the gang plays, but still enjoys candy in moderation. Ziggy is an unsophisticated character who possesses naivety and gullibility. He is also obsessed with Sportacus and idolizes him.
 Pixel (puppeteered by Ronald Binion/Julie Westwood and voiced by Noel MacNeal/Kobie Powell/Chris Knowings/Ronald Binion in the US and Joanna Ruiz in the UK) is an inventor, passionate about computers and technology. He fixes up all sorts of gadgets to avoid doing physical activities himself. Pixel is not very sociable due to the large amount of time he spends alone, usually playing video games. He has a crush on Stephanie and finds it difficult to talk to her in early episodes. He represents intelligence and common sense. His house often serves as a meeting spot for the rest of kids, since it is spacious and contains a television.
 Stingy (puppeteered and voiced by Jodi Eichelberger in the US and Sarah Burgess/Julie Westwood in the UK) is a selfish, covetous, and upper-class male who wears a yellow vest with a polka-dotted bow tie. He owns a yellow car and frequently mentions his unseen father, supposedly the wealthiest man in town. Stingy tends to be snide and churlish. He represents possessiveness and a self-centered attitude.
 Trixie (puppeteered by Amanda Maddock/Sarah Burgess/Heather Asch/Aymee Garcia and voiced by Sarah Burgess/Aymee Garcia in the US and Joanna Ruiz in the UK) is a mischievous prankster who likes jokes. She tends to make sarcastic remarks about her friends. She refers to Stephanie as "Pinky" (due to her outfit and hair color) when trying to get her attention. In the theme song, Trixie loves to draw moustaches over the Meanswell's posters. Trixie represents impatience and a lack of respect for rules.
 Mayor Milford Meanswell (puppeteered and voiced by David Matthew Feldman) is the mayor who has a crush on Miss Busybody. He loves his niece Stephanie very much and calls Sportacus to help if she feels sad or is in trouble. His catchphrase is "Oh my!" whenever anything is wrong. The mayor is old-fashioned and often perplexed by modern technological terms.
 Bessie Busybody (puppeteered and voiced by Julie Westwood) is the town PR agent and Mayor Milford's secretary/girlfriend. Although patronizing, she tries her best to be motherly with the children. She is pompous, fashionable, and aware of every new trend. She likes to talk on her cellphone and is sometimes so engaged in a phone call that she is oblivious to the events occurring around her.

Recurring
 Piggy is Stingy's piggy bank pet, which he treats as if it were a person and often pretends is alive. He considers Piggy his best friend.
 Jives is a tall and lanky teenage boy who lives alone in his personal house, matching his physical appearance being tall and thin with a green roof and yellow body, that appears to be bending over. He wears a green cap and a yellow sweatshirt. Jives is only physically seen in the Icelandic plays, but his home remains in the TV series. He also makes several cameos on cards and books.
 The rooster is a symbol of LazyTown, appearing on the town seal and on the papers in Mayor Meanswell's filing cabinets. His crowing can be heard during scenes set in the early morning. In the second play, the rooster was an anthropomorphic character who acted as a narrator.
 The cat is a small black and white kitten who appears three times in Season 1. The kitten has a propensity for climbing trees and often needs Sportacus to rescue him.

Episodes

Fifty-two episodes were produced for the first two seasons of LazyTown between 2004 and 2007.

History and production
LazyTown began as a storybook published in 1995 titled Áfram Latibær! ("Go Go LazyTown!"). In 1996, a stage adaptation of the book was shown in Iceland. It featured Stephanie as an out-of-shape dancer and Sportacus as an energetic elf. The puppet characters seen in the television series also appeared in human form, but Robbie Rotten did not yet exist. A second stage show titled Glanni Glæpur í Latabæ ("Robbie Rotten in LazyTown") debuted in 1999. It introduced Stefán Karl Stefánsson as Robbie and featured more finalized versions of the other characters. Nickelodeon Australia reported that by the time the second play finished touring, LazyTown had become a household name in Iceland. A variety of tie-in products and media were created in the country before Scheving decided to develop LazyTown into a television program; these included bottled water, toy figures, and a radio station.

In most episodes, the only characters played by live actors are Stephanie, Sportacus, and Robbie Rotten. The rest of the characters are depicted as puppets, made by the Neal Scanlan Studio and Wit Puppets. The show was filmed and produced at 380 Studios, a purpose-built studio near Reykjavík equipped with high-end HDTV production facilities and one of the largest green screens in the world. The production floor area is 1,800 square meters. The budget for each episode was approximately ISK 70,000,000 (US$1 million), about five times the average cost for a children's television program at the time, making it "the most expensive children's show in the world" according to Scheving.

Its virtual sets were generated with an Unreal Engine 3-based framework, created by Raymond P. Le Gué and known as XRGen4. According to Le Gué, "We start with the live actors and puppets on a physical set with a green screen behind them as a backdrop. The green screen is replaced in real time with the sets created in XRGen4 using UE3. As we move the camera and actors around the physical set, the backdrop scene also moves in real time in complete synchronization with the movements of the real camera. All of this is recorded, and the director can watch the resulting composition in real time." Seasons 3 and 4 of LazyTown were filmed as usual in the LazyTown Studios in Iceland, but the special effects for these series were created this by Turner Studios in Atlanta.

Television and on-demand history
In the United States, the show debuted on Nick Jr. on 16 August 2004 and ended in 15 October 2007. The second season debuted in the United States on Nick Jr. in 2006. It also aired in the United States on CBS, as part of the Nick Jr. on CBS Saturday morning block, from 18 September 2004 to 9 September 2006. The series aired daily on the Nick Jr. channel from 28 September 2009 until 19 July 2010. On 18 April 2011, Sprout acquired the US TV rights to LazyTown, and started airing the series on 5 September 2011. It aired daily on the channel until 26 September 2016.

The series has been broadcast on a variety of networks internationally, many of which belong to Viacom Media Networks. Nickelodeon Southeast Asia has carried the program in eleven territories. In Austria and Germany, it is shown on Nickelodeon Austria In the United Kingdom and Ireland, it aired on Nick Jr. UK, Noggin, Boomerang and CBeebies. The series arrived in the UK on the 3rd of October 2005, making a simultaneous debut on both Nickelodeon and CBeebies. CBeebies aired the first two series and stopped repeats in March 2012. Nick Jr UK stopped airing repeats in 2011. After the series was revived for seasons three and four, Turner's Cartoonito premiered episodes from 2013 to 2014. Viacom's Channel 5 also aired the newer episodes as part of its Milkshake! block until 2016. Channel 5's Demand 5 service carried episodes of the Icelandic version in 2015.

In 2008, a Spanish-dubbed version of LazyTown debuted on V-me, a television network created for the Hispanic market in the US. NBC began airing it every Saturday on 7 July 2012, as part of the new Saturday morning NBC Kids pre-school block, until 25 September 2016. The Spanish-dubbed version also airs on Telemundo (a sister station to NBC) as part of the weekend pre-school morning block MiTelemundo.

In Brazil, the two first seasons of the show was broadcast with Brazilian Portuguese dubbing on SBT (on the children's television block Bom Dia & Cia), and subsequently on Discovery Kids. The two last seasons was broadcast on Boomerang until 2018.

In Serbia, Bosnia-Herzegovina and Macedonia, the show was broadcast on Ultra TV. A Croatian-dubbed version called Lijeni Grad was broadcast in Croatia on HRT 2. In the European Portuguese-dubbed version, the show aired on Nick Jr. and Canal Panda in Portugal. The series has been dubbed into thirty-two languages. In the Icelandic dub, actors Magnús Scheving (Sportacus), Guðmundur Þór Kárason (Ziggy) and Stefán Karl Stefánsson (Robbie Rotten) dubbed themselves on the soubdtrack.

Reception

Ratings
The week of LazyTowns debut on Nickelodeon in the United States was the channel's highest-rated premiere week in three years. A broadcast of the hour-long primetime episode "LazyTown's New Superhero" in August 2005 drew three million total viewers, ranking number-one in its time period among all broadcast and cable television with the 2–5, 2–11, and 6–11 demographics. The episode garnered double-digit increases over the last Nick Jr. primetime special to air before it, which was an episode of the network's then-highest-rated series Dora the Explorer.

Critical reception
The Hollywood Reporters Marilyn Moss praised the show's intentions to encourage exercise, calling it "great fun for the very young set, not to mention educational, maybe even life-changing." Justin New of The Washington Times called LazyTown "a great show" and stated that he admired the Sportacus character. Common Sense Media's Joly Herman gave the show a more mixed review, stating that the characters' healthy choices are "sometimes lost in the show's chaotic nature." Pete Vonder Haar of the Houston Press called LazyTown "pretty much the creepiest show on TV since Twin Peaks," citing the "off-putting" mix of live-action and puppetry.

The program has been noted for its appeal towards multiple age groups. In 2005, The Boston Globe stated that the program "has sparked a cult of healthy living among a certain preschool set [and] has a grown-up following, too." Lynne Heffley of the Los Angeles Times stated that LazyTown "has zany appeal, even to viewers who are no longer 'junior.'"

Accolades

In popular culture
In 2007, the song "You Are a Pirate" from the 12th episode "Rottenbeard" became an internet meme. In 2011, the song was covered by the pirate metal band Alestorm in their album Back Through Time.

In 2008, the song "Cooking By The Book" from the 6th episode "Swiped Sweets" became an internet meme. It was remixed with Lil Jon's part from his 2004 Snoop Dogg collaboration "Step Yo Game Up". The original upload has over 10 million views while a reupload has amassed over 40 million views. It went further viral on the now defunct video sharing service, Vine. 

The song "We Are Number One" was named "Dank Meme of the Year" in 2016 on the Reddit subreddit /r/dankmemes, a popular subreddit for memes. The Robbie Rotten memes began in October that year when Stefán Karl Stefánsson, the actor who played Robbie Rotten, announced that he was diagnosed with bile duct cancer.

A GoFundMe page was established by LazyTown head writer Mark Valenti to help the actor as he endured his illness. "We Are Number One" and many other LazyTown videos were used to promote the fundraising effort, which eventually surpassed its $100,000 goal. The campaign was popularized by the YouTube channel SiIvaGunner uploading a "We Are Number One" video. To thank his supporters, Stefánsson celebrated by uploading a video of that song performed with his former cast members and LazyTowns composer. On 13 August 2017, Stefánsson was declared cancer free after a successful surgery; however, he died on 21 August 2018 after his cancer recurred.

LazyTown Extra

On 15 September 2008, a spin-off television series called LazyTown Extra debuted in the United Kingdom on CBeebies. A "magazine format style show" for 3 to 6-year-olds, it features characters from LazyTown in an assortment of short sketches. 26 episodes of Lazy Town Extra were produced, each between 11 and 15 minutes in duration.

Merchandise
In February 2005, Nickelodeon unveiled a collection of LazyTown products at the American International Toy Fair. Fisher-Price partnered with Viacom's consumer product division to produce the merchandise, all of which was designed to encourage physical activity.

Promotional events

From June to August 2005, LazyTowns Stephanie hosted the "Nick Jr. Power Play Summer" event, which involved a series of television spots that replaced the channel's standard on-air continuity. Similarly to the live performances and the program itself, this campaign was an experiment designed by the network to increase awareness of exercise and nutrition in its preschool audience.

Nickelodeon produced a stage show titled LazyTown Live! in 2005. It debuted at Nickelodeon Suites Resort on 6 August. A modified version toured the United Kingdom and Ireland between October 2007 and August 2008. It introduced a new cast to the United Kingdom, including Julian Essex-Spurrier as Sportacus.

A Spanish-speaking version of the live show premiered in Mexico in 2008, followed by Argentina, Costa Rica, Guatemala and Panama. , it was scheduled to tour the United States in 2010. A Brazilian version of the live show premiered in São Paulo in October 2008. New productions of LazyTown Live had their premieres in November 2009 in Portugal and in March 2010 in Spain by producers Lemon Entertainment. A stage play premiering in 2011 introduced the character and concept for Roboticus, which became the first episode of Season 3 of the show in an abridged form.

From 28 January 2009 to 29 November 2009, a live stage production entitled LazyTown Live! The Pirate Adventure toured the United Kingdom and Ireland. It featured characters and songs from LazyTown, performed by a new cast. In 2016, a UK production entitled LazyTown Live On Stage ran from 7 July 2016 to 4 September 2016. This production was posted on YouTube and featured the song "We Are Number One".

A live show LazyTown in Schools premiered in Australia in 2012, touring schools to promote healthy eating and fitness for children.

See also
 List of Internet phenomena
 Television in Iceland

Notes

References

External links

 
 
 
 LazyTown bubblegum dance music discography at Bubblegum Dancer

 
2004 Icelandic television series debuts
2008 Icelandic television series endings
2000s children's television series
2000s comedy television series
2000s Icelandic television series
Children's comedy television series
Musical television series
Television series with live action and animation
Australian Broadcasting Corporation original programming
BBC children's television shows
2000s Nickelodeon original programming
CBeebies
Nick Jr. original programming
Boomerang (TV network) original programming
Cartoonito original programming
Universal Kids original programming
Mass media franchises
Television shows featuring puppetry
Fictional populated places
2000s preschool education television series
2010s preschool education television series
Television shows set in Iceland
Film and television memes
Television series about children
English-language television shows